Mango was Poland's first all-day teleshopping channel owned by Scripps Networks Interactive. It was launched on March 1, 2002. In July 2020, it was announced that the broadcasting of Mango 24 would be ended on July 31, 2020.

References

External links
 

Defunct television channels in Poland
Television channels and stations established in 2002
2002 establishments in Poland
Television channels and stations disestablished in 2020
2020 disestablishments in Poland